Armant Agricole Jean Baptiste Legendre (June 17, 1899 – November 1963) was an American football player. He played at the end position for the Princeton Tigers football team and was selected International News Service, Walter Eckersall and Football World magazine as a first-team player on the 1920 College Football All-America Team.  He was picked as a second-team All-American by Walter Camp.  He also played basketball for Princeton.

After graduating from Princeton, Legendre served as the ends coach for Princeton in 1921.  He was of Creole heritage and later lived in New Orleans and worked as a coffee importer.  In May 1931, he was appointed by President Herbert Hoover to the Brazilian Coffee Commission.  His daughter Anne Armstrong was the United States Ambassador to the United Kingdom from 1976 to 1977.

References

External links

1899 births
1963 deaths
American football ends
Princeton Tigers football coaches
Princeton Tigers football players
Princeton Tigers men's basketball players
All-American college football players
People from Bar Harbor, Maine
Players of American football from Maine
Players of American football from New Orleans
American men's basketball players
Sportspeople from New Orleans